The 1946 FIBA European Championship, commonly called FIBA EuroBasket 1946, was the fourth FIBA EuroBasket regional basketball championship, held by FIBA and the first since 1939 due to World War II. Ten national teams affiliated with the International Basketball Federation (FIBA) took part in the competition. Switzerland hosted the tournament for a second time, as the championship returned to Geneva.

EuroBasket 1946 saw the beginning of the use of the jump shot, pioneered by Italy's Giuseppe Stefanini.

Results
The 1946 competition consisted of a preliminary round, with one group of four teams and two groups of three teams each.  Each team played the other teams in its group once.  The top team in each of the groups of three and the top two teams in the group of four played in the semifinals for the top four rankings; the middle teams in the two groups of three moved directly on to the final round for a 5th/6th place playoff; the bottom team in each group of three and the two bottom teams in the group of four played in semifinals for the 7th–10th ranks.

First round

Group A

Group B

Group C

Final round
The middle team of each of the groups of three did not compete in the final round, as they advanced directly to the 5th/6th place playoff. The top team of each of those groups played one of the top two teams of the group of four, with rankings 1st–4th at stake.  Similarly, the bottom team in each group of three played one of the two lower teams in the group of four in a semifinal for 7th–10th places.

Brackets

Classification 5th–10th

Upper bracket

Final standings

Team rosters
1. Czechoslovakia: Ivan Mrázek, Miloš Bobocký, Jiří Drvota, Josef Ezr, Gustav Hermann, Jan Hluchy, Josef Křepela, Pavel Nerad, Ladislav Simácek, František Stibitz, Josef Toms, Ladislav Trpkoš, Emil Velenský, Miroslav Vondráček (Coach: Frantisek Hajek)

2. Italy: Cesare Rubini, Giuseppe Stefanini, Sergio Stefanini, Albino Bocciai, Mario Cattarini, Marcello de Nardus, Armando Fagarazzi, Giancarlo Marinelli, Valentino Pellarini, Tullio Pitacco, Venzo Vannini

3. Hungary: François Németh, Geza Bajari, Antal Bankuti, Geza Kardos, Laszlo Kiralyhidi, Tibor Mezőfi, György Nagy, Geza Racz, Ede Vadaszi, Ferenc Velkei (Coach: Istvan Kiraly)

4. France: Robert Busnel, André Buffière, Etienne Roland, Paul Chaumont, René Chocat, Jean Duperray, Emile Frezot, Maurice Girardot, Andre Goeuriot, Henri Lesmayoux, Jacques Perrier, Lucien Rebuffic, Justy Specker, Andre Tartary (Coach: Paul Geist)

External links
FIBA Europe EuroBasket 1946
FIBA Europe article on 1940s EuroBaskets
Eurobasket.com 1946 EChampionship

1946
1946 in basketball
E
1946 in Swiss sport
April 1946 sports events in Europe
May 1946 sports events in Europe
Sports competitions in Geneva
20th century in Geneva